Yaru Railway Station (Balochi: یارو ریلوے اسٹیشن) is located in Yaru village, Pishin district of Balochistan province of the Pakistan.

See also
 List of railway stations in Pakistan
 Pakistan Railways

References

Railway stations in Pishin District
Railway stations on Rohri–Chaman Railway Line